Melanohalea subelegantula is a species of lichen in the family Parmeliaceae. It is found in North America, where it grows on bark and wood. The lichen was first formally described as Parmelia subelegantula by Ted Esslinger in 1977. A year later he transferred it to the segregate genus Melanelia. In 2004, it was moved to the newly circumscribed genus Melanohalea. Named for its resemblance to Melanohalea elegantula, it can be distinguished from that species by its slightly flattened, but not hollow, isidia.

References

subelegantula
Lichen species
Lichens described in 1977
Lichens of North America